The Radin Mas Single Member Constituency is a single member constituency (SMC) located in the central area of Singapore. The ward covers a portion of Bukit Merah, specifically the suburbs of Redhill, Bukit Merah Central, the eastern half of Telok Blangah, Bukit Purmei Estate and Mount Faber. The current Member of Parliament is Melvin Yong of the People's Action Party (PAP).

Town Council

Radin Mas SMC is managed by the Tanjong Pajar Town Council.

Members of Parliament

Electoral results

Elections in 1970s

Elections in 1980s

Elections in 2010s

Elections in 2020s

References

 2020 General Election's result
2015 General Election results
2011 General Election results
1984 General Election results
1980 General Election results
1977 (First) May By-Election's result — There were 2 by elections held in 1977 on various constituencies
1976 General Election's result

Singaporean electoral divisions